The men's decathlon event at the 2010 South American Games was held on 20–21 March.

Medalists

Records

Results
Results were published.

100m

Long jump

Shot put

High jump

400m

110m hurdles

Discus throw

Pole vault

Javelin throw

1500m

Final standings

See also
2010 South American Under-23 Championships in Athletics

References

External links
100m 
Long jump 
Shot put 
High jump 
400m 
110m hurdles 
Discus throw 
Pole vault 
Javelin throw 
1500m 
Final standings

Decathlon M